Adventures in Paradise may refer to:

 Adventures in Paradise (TV series)
 "Adventures in Paradise", aka "Theme from Adventures in Paradise", composed by Lionel Newman, recorded by many inc. Arthur Lyman, Santo & Johnny, Rob E. G., and (words by Dorcas Cochran) Bing Crosby
 Adventures in Paradise, EP by Robie Porter, credited as "Rob E. G."; title track also released on single, B-side of "Tim-buc-too"
 "Adventures in Paradise" (Frasier), two-part episode
 Adventures in Paradise (Minnie Riperton album)
 "Adventures in Paradise" (Minnie Riperton song), song from Adventures in Paradise
 Adventures in Paradise (Christopher Williams album)
 "Adventures in Paradise", song by Ace of Base on Flowers (Ace of Base album) and Cruel Summer (Ace of Base album)
 "Adventures in Paradise", score heard in Pokémon: The First Movie

See also 

 Adventure in Paradise, Hong Kong film